Neomegamelanus elongatus is a species of delphacid planthopper in the family Delphacidae. It is found in the Caribbean and North America.

Subspecies
Two subspecies belong to the species Neomegamelanus elongatus:
 Neomegamelanus elongatus elongatus (Ball, 1905) i g
 Neomegamelanus elongatus reductus (Caldwell in Caldwell and Martorell, 1951) i c g
Data sources: i = ITIS, c = Catalogue of Life, g = GBIF, b = Bugguide.net

References

Articles created by Qbugbot
Insects described in 1905
Delphacinae